Tang-e Zard may refer to:
 Tang-e Zard, Bushehr
 Tang-e Zard, Fars
 Tang-e Zard, Kohgiluyeh and Boyer-Ahmad